Haksan Publishing Co., Ltd., a subsidiary of Daewon Media, is a South Korean publisher, famous for its large selections of domestic and imported comics (manga/manhwa) and light novels. It was established in Seoul in 1995.

Publishing

Magazines
 Chance (Chanseu) – Monthly comics magazine for boys.
 Booking – Bi-weekly comics magazine for boys.
 Party (Pa-ti) – Monthly comics magazine for girls.

Collected volumes imprints
 Chance Comics (Chanseu Komikseu)

Light novels
 May Queen Novel (Meikwin Nobel) – Translated version of Kadokawa Beans Bunko (Kadokawa Shoten) and Cobalt Bunko.
 Extreme Novel (Ikseuteurim Nobel) – Translated version of Kadokawa Sneaker Bunko (Kadokawa Shoten), Dengeki Bunko, Fujimi Mystery Bunko (Fujimi Shobo), Famitsu Bunko (Enterbrain), EX novels (Square Enix).
 Carnival Novel (Kanibal Novel) – Original Korean light novels.

Manhwa 
 Rure, a sunjung manhwa (young girl's comic) by Da-Mi Seomoon serialized in Party magazine.. It was licensed by Tokyopop in the United States and by Saphira in France.

References

External links
 
 May Queen Novel

Daewon Media subsidiaries
Magazine publishing companies
Manga distributors
Comic book publishing companies of South Korea
Publishing companies established in 1995
Mass media in Seoul